Karna Lidmar-Bergström (born 1940) is a Swedish geologist and geomorphologist known for her study of Pre-Quaternary landforms in Sweden and Norway. In 2004 she was elected into the Royal Swedish Academy of Sciences.

Lidmar-Bergström studied at Lund University under professor Karl-Erik Bergsten. Later Mats Åkesson served as her unofficial doctoral advisor, as the tutor system did not exist back then.

Notable publications
1982. Pre-Quaternary Geomorphological  Evolution  in  Southern  Fennoscandia. Meddelanden  från  Lunds  Universitets  Geografiska  Institution,  Avhandlingar,  91 /Sveriges Geologiska Undersökning Serie  C,  785.
1996.  Long  term  morphotectonic  evolution  in Sweden.  Geomorphology,  16,  33–59.

References

1940 births
Swedish geographers
20th-century Swedish geologists
Swedish geomorphologists
Living people
Lund University alumni
People connected to Lund University
Academic staff of Stockholm University
Members of the Royal Swedish Academy of Sciences
Swedish women geologists
Swedish women academics